The CMLL Torneo Nacional de Parejas Increíbles 2018 or "National Incredible Pairs Tournament 2018" is a tag team Lucha Libre tournament held by the Mexican wrestling promotion Consejo Mundial de Lucha Libre (CMLL). The tournament is based on the Lucha Libre Parejas Increíbles match concept, which pairs two wrestlers of opposite allegiance, one portraying a villain, referred to as a "rudo" in Lucha Libre wrestling terminology, and one portraying a fan favorites, or "técnico". The 2018 version of the tournament was the ninth time in a row that CMLL held the tournament since the first tournament in 2010. The winners are presented with a trophy but not given any other tangible reward for the victory.

The finals were originally scheduled to take place on Friday, February 16, 2018, but due to an earthquake hitting Mexico City on that day the show was canceled while the building was inspected for structural damage. The finals took place on March 23 instead. The 16-team tournament was won by the team of Rush and El Terrible, who had been long-time rivals from 2011 to 2013, and had previously teamed up for the 2012, 2013 and 2017 tournaments. The duo defeated Volador Jr. and Último Guerrero in the finals of the three-week tournament. After the tournament El Terrible joined Rush's group called Los Ingobernables and together they won the CMLL World Tag Team Championship

History

The Mexican professional wrestling promotion Consejo Mundial de Lucha Libre (CMLL; "World Wrestling Council") held their first Torneo Nacional de Parejas Increíbles ("National Incredible Pairs Tournament") in 2010, from January 22 through February 5, marking the beginning of an annual tournament. CMLL has previous held Parejas Increíbles tournaments on an irregular basis and often promoted individual Parejas Increíbles and Relevos Increíbles ("Incredible Relay", with teams of three or more wrestlers). The Parejas Increíbles concept is a long-standing tradition in lucha libre and is at times referred to as a "strange bedfellows" match in English speaking countries, because a Pareja Increible consists of a face (referred to as a técnico in Lucha Libre, or a "good guy") and a heel (a rudo, those that portray "the bad guys") teamed up for a specific match, or in this case for a tournament. The 2018 tournament was the ninth annual Parejas Increíbles tournament, and like its predecessors held as part of CMLL's regular Friday night CMLL Super Viernes ("Super Friday") shows.

Tournament
The tournament featured 15 professional wrestling matches with different wrestlers teaming up, some of whom were involved in pre-existing scripted feuds or storylines while others were simply paired up for the tournament. For the Torneo Nacional de Parejas Increíbles tournaments, CMLL often teamed up a técnico (those that portray the "good guys" in wrestling, also known as faces) and a rudo (the "bad guy" or heels) who are involved in a pre-existing storyline feud at the time of the tournament so that the tournament itself can be used as a storytelling device to help tell the story of escalating confrontations between two feuding wrestlers. The tournament format followed CMLL's traditional tournament formats, with two qualifying blocks of eight teams that competed during the first and second week of the tournament and a final match between the two block winners. The qualifying blocks were all one-fall matches while the tournament final was a best two-out-of-three-falls tag team match.

Tournament participants
Block A
Ángel de Oro  and El Cuatrero 
Atlantis  and Mr. Niebla 
Blue Panther Jr.  and Máscara Año 2000 
Carístico  and Euforia 
Marco Corleone  and Shocker 
Dragon Lee  and Sansón 
Rush  and El Terrible 
Stuka Jr.  and Forastero 

Block B
Blue Panther  and Sam Adonis 
Diamante Azul  and Comandante Pierroth 
Místico  and Mephisto 
Niebla Roja  and Gran Guerrero 
Soberano Jr.  and Hechicero 
Titán  and Bárbaro Cavernario 
Valiente  and Rey Bucanero 
Volador Jr.  and Último Guerrero

Ongoing storylines
The team of Rush and El Terrible had teamed together in two previous Parejas Increíbles tournaments, both as part of a long, heated storyline feud between the two that ran from 2011 through 2012. The storyline saw El Terrible defeat Rush to win the vacant CMLL World Heavyweight Championship,  The two were teamed up for the 2012 Torneo Nacional de Parejas Increíbles as CMLL continued to build the feud. The two were able to work together well enough to make it to the finals of the tournament but lost to Atlantis and Euforia in the finals when they were unable to get along. After the loss Rush made a Lucha de Apuestas challenge to El Terrible. The storyline culminated on September 14 in the main event of CMLL's 79th Anniversary Show, where El Terrible lost and as a result, shaved bald. In March, 2013 El Terrible and Rush teamed up for the 2013 Torneo de Parejas Increíbles and were teamed up again for the 2017 Torneo de Parejas Increíbles unsuccessfully as they were eliminated Atlantis and Euforia in the second round.

Tournament brackets

Tournament shows

February 2, 2018

February 9, 2018

February 23, 2018

Aftermath
After the victory both Rush invited El Terrible to join Los Ingobernables, an offer El Terrible immediately accepted, joining forces with Rush and El Bestia del Ring. On July 13, Rush and El Terrible defeated Volador Jr. and Valiente to win the CMLL World Tag Team Championship as part of an ongoing storyline between Los Ingobernables and Volador Jr. and his family.

References

2018 in professional wrestling
CMLL Torneo Nacional de Parejas Increibles
Lucha libre
February 2018 events in Mexico